Western Coal and Coke Company No. 1 is a preserved Canadian 4-6-0 "ten-wheeler" steam locomotive built by the Montreal Locomotive Works in 1913. It was originally built as part of a standard locomotive design with 1880's specifications, in order to help construct the Canadian National Transcontinental Railway. It was retired from revenue service in 1964, and it was subsequently purchased by the Mid-Continent Railway Museum, which subsequently used it to pull their tourist trains. As of 2023, it is undergoing a thorough rebuild.

History

Development 
Western Coal and Coke Company No. 1's design was first developed in the late 1880's by the Pittsburgh Locomotive Works. The early 4-6-0 design came with a straight boiler, and copies of the design were purchased by such American railroads as the Bessemer and Lake Erie, the Pittsburgh and Lake Erie, and the Duluth, Missabe and Northern. By the turn of the 20th century, though, as a result of larger and more modern locomotive designs being developed, the early Pittsburgh design became obsolete, and several of the remaining locomotives of the design became owned or leased by Canadian companies through equipment dealerships. When the third Transcontinental Railway across Canada was under construction, a small locomotive with low speed was needed to assist with the construction. 

The early Pittsburgh design was subsequently redesigned with a larger firebox and superheated flues, which would create a higher boiler pressure and a greater tractive effort. The Montreal Locomotive Works (MLW) initially constructed fifteen locomotives of the 4-6-0 design for assistance of constructing the National Transcontinental Railway, but due to the success of the design, various Canadian railways and industrial companies subsequently ordered locomotives of the same design, in order to save designing and construction costs.

Revenue service 
The Western Coal and Coke Company (WC&C), a coal company that served certain parts of Alberta, ordered one locomotive of this design from the MLW, which was built and delivered in December 1913, and it was numbered 1. No. 1 was initially assigned to pull coal trains on branchlines in and out of Beaver Mines, Alberta. The WC&C eventually changed its name to the Royalties Oil and Share Corporation, when it began transporting oil. In 1935, the corporation was merged with Lethbridge Collieries Limited, and although ownership of No. 1 was transferred, the locomotive retained its original roadnumber. It was subsequently reassigned to pull trains out of Plyami, Alberta. No. 1 was retired from revenue service in 1964, four years after commercial steam ended on both the Canadian National and Canadian Pacific Railways.

Preservation 
In February 1965, No. 1 was purchased by Ray Buhrmaster and Stan Mailer, two members of the recently-established Mid-Continent Railway Museum (MCRM). The locomotive was subsequently moved via flatcar to North Freedom, Wisconsin on October 30 of that year, and museum members and volunteers began working to restore the locomotive to operating condition with a renewed flue time. Restoration work was completed in 1970, and the locomotive replaced Louisiana Cypress No. 2 as one of the MCRM's operational tourist locomotives. No. 1 spent the next twenty-two years pulling four-mile tourist trains on the MCRM's former Chicago and North Western (C&NW) trackage between North Freedom and Rattlesnake Station near La Rue. In 1991, the locomotive's original wooden cab was replaced with a newly-made one. However, on February 15, 1992, the locomotive was removed from service after experiencing some issues with its firebox. Museum crews subsequently inspected the locomotive, and it was discovered that No. 1's boiler needed to be reworked. 

Museum crews subsequently spent the next decade repairing the locomotive's boiler, frame, and tender; in December 2003, crews began the process of replacing all of the studs in the boiler. In February 2004, the belly section beneath the boiler barrel was cut out to make way for a new patch of material. In May of that year, the centers of the driving wheels were tested for cracks using the Magnaflux process, and results detected a few cracks. In November, new patches were welded to the open belly section beneath the barrel. In late December, crews began constructing a replacement smokebox for No. 1. In March 2005, new replacement tubes were found that would be applied to No. 1's boiler. In November of that year, crews began creating a new front tube sheet from scratch, as a replacement for the old one. In February 2006, a replacement rear tube sheet was also beginning to be made. In December of that year, Museum employee Roger Hugg began to create a new replacement cowcatcher for No. 1 in his own shop at his home in Elroy. In January 2007, the driving wheels were sandblasted and trucked to DRM Industries in Madison to be primed before being shipped again to be repaired at the Tennessee Valley Railroad Museum (TVRM). In June of that year, a new pilot beam was fitted onto the frame. In September, work on the driving wheels was completed, and they were subsequently shipped back to North Freedom. In February 2008, work began at the TVRM to create a new rear firebox sheet for No. 1. In June of that year, however, the MCRM's property was inundated by floodwaters from the nearby Baraboo River, and the museum subsequently concentrated their efforts on repairing and reorganizing the damages while the rebuild on No. 1 was temporarily halted. As of 2023, restoration work on No. 1 is on hold, since MCRM crews are concentrating their efforts on rebuilding C&NW 4-6-0 No. 1385.

See also 

 Canadian National 1009
 Canadian National 89
 Canadian National 1392
 Canadian National 7470
 Soo Line 2645
 Chicago and North Western 175

References 

Preserved steam locomotives of Canada
Preserved steam locomotives of Wisconsin
4-6-0 locomotives
Railway locomotives introduced in 1913
Individual locomotives of Canada
Individual locomotives of the United States
Standard gauge locomotives of Canada
Standard gauge locomotives of the United States
MLW locomotives